Emily Howell is a computer program created by David Cope, a music professor at the University of California, Santa Cruz. Emily Howell is an interactive interface that "hears" feedback from listeners, and builds its own musical compositions from a source database, derived from a previous composing program called Experiments in Musical Intelligence (EMI). Cope attempts to “teach” the program by providing feedback so that it can cultivate its own "personal" style. The software appears to be based on latent semantic analysis.

Emily Howell’s first album was released in February 2009 by Centaur Records (CRC 3023). Titled From Darkness, Light, this album contains its Opus 1, Opus 2, and Opus 3 compositions for chamber orchestra and multiple pianos. Its second album Breathless was released in December 2012 by Centaur Records (CRC 3255).

See also 
 List of music software
 Music and artificial intelligence
 Computer music
 Sonification

References 

 Computer Models of Musical Creativity, MIT Press (December 16, 2005),

External links 
main

Artificial intelligence art
Computer music software
Computer-related introductions in 2009
University of California, Santa Cruz